The white-eyed slaty flycatcher (Melaenornis fischeri) is a small passerine bird of the genus Melaenornis in the Old World flycatcher family Muscicapidae.  It is native to the African highlands from Ethiopia and Kenya through Rwanda to eastern Zaire and Malawi. The sub-species M. f. toruensis occurs in Rwanda and Burundi and has an inconspicuous eye-ring.

The specific epithet commemorates the German explorer Gustav Adolf Fischer.

Gallery

References

 http://www.kenyabirds.org.uk/slaty.htm

white-eyed slaty flycatcher
Birds of East Africa
Birds described in 1884